Conops elegans is a fly species in the genus Conops that can be found in Cyprus, France, and Spain.

References

Conopidae
Insects described in 1824
Muscomorph flies of Europe